Anchor Square is the central square in the city of Kronstadt, outside Saint Peterburg.

Further reading 

 
 
 

Kronstadt
Squares in Russia